The Recap is a compilation album by rapper Mr. Envi'. It was released on January 7, 2014 by Tate Music Group, then later re-released under his own brand.

Track listing

Back It Off (featuring Jeramie of TRT) — 3:00
I'mma Boss — 3:55
Re Up — 3:17
Spotlight — 3:00
Where U From (featuring JB) — 3:05
Get At Me — 3:25
Don't Wait (featuring JTL) — 3:32
Keep It Poppin' (featuring S.G.) — 4:16
Do It Big (featuring S.G. & Bigg Redd) — 4:28

References

External links 

2014 albums
Mr. Envi' albums